Anyon is a type of quasiparticle.

Anyon may also refer to:

 Jean Anyon (1941–2013), was an American critical thinker
 Joe Anyon (born 1986), English football goalkeeper
 James Anyon (born 1983), former cricketer
 Alan D. Anyon (born 1931), British philatelist

See also 
 Anion, a negatively charged ion